Robert Lawrence may refer to:

 Robert Lawrence (architect), president of the American Institute of Architects from 1981 to 1982
 Robert Lawrence (British Army officer) (born 1960)
 Robert Lawrence (golf course architect) (1893–1976), golf course architect
 Robert Lawrence (martyr) (died 1535), English saint
 Robert Lawrence (MP), Member of Parliament (MP) for Lancashire
 Robert Lawrence (film editor) (1913–2004), Oscar-nominated film editor on Spartacus
 Robert Daniel Lawrence (1892–1968), British physician
 Robert Henry Lawrence Jr. (1935–1967), astronaut
 Robert Means Lawrence, (1847-1935), American physician and writer
 Robert Morgan Lawrence, sex educator with the Center for Sex & Culture
 Robert William Lawrence (1807–1833), botanist
 Robert Z. Lawrence (born 1949), Harvard professor
 Robert Lawrence Stine (born 1943), American novelist
 Robert Lawrence (producer) (born 1953), American film producer and studio executive
 Bob Lawrence, baseball player
 "Bob Lawrence", a joint pseudonym used by Bob Oksner and Lawrence Nadle on the "I Love Lucy" comic strip